Sergio López-Rivera is a Spanish make-up artist. He won an Academy Award in the category Best Makeup and Hairstyling for the film Ma Rainey's Black Bottom.

Selected filmography 
 Ma Rainey's Black Bottom (2020; co-won with Mia Neal and Jamika Wilson)

References

External links 

Living people
1967 births
People from Seville
People from Cantabria
Spanish make-up artists
Best Makeup Academy Award winners
American LGBT artists
Best Makeup BAFTA Award winners